Mkristo Eugene Bruce (born October 16, 1984) is a former American football defensive end. He was signed by the Miami Dolphins as an undrafted free agent in 2007. He played college football at Washington State.

Bruce has also been a member of the Oakland Raiders, Arizona Rattlers, Jacksonville Jaguars, and Florida Tuskers.

Early years
Bruce graduated from  Liberty Senior High School in 2002 where he earned eight letters competing in basketball and track, along with football. As a junior, he started at quarterback and linebacker, where he was named honorable mention All-Kingco, His senior year, he was named a Seattle Times Red Chip prospect as the team finished 4-5 overall and 4-5 in the Kingco Conference. He was a First-team All-league pick as a linebacker and the second-team quarterback after passed for 718 yards and seven touchdowns while rushing for 602 yards and six touchdowns.

College career
Bruce was a four-year letterman at Washington State and played in 47 career contests, including34 starts, all coming over his final three seasons. He totaled 203 tackles, 45.5 stops for loss, 29.5 sacks and an interception. As a senior, he had 11 sacks and 16 tackles for losses to go with his 57 tackles and First-team All-Pac-10 selection. In 2005, as a junior, he played in and started 11 games finished the season 67 tackles and 15 TFL, 10 sacks and two fumbles recovered and three forced fumbles for which he was named Second-team Pacific-10 Conference second-team and ESPN.com First-team All-Pac-10 first-team. He started all 11 games in 2004 and recorded 60 tackles (12.5 for losses) and 6.5 sacks). In 2003, he played in 13 games with no starts and made 9 tackles (2 for losses) and 2 sacks. In 2002, he redshirted.

Professional career

Pre-draft
He ran the  dash in 4.98 seconds and 4.89 seconds, the short shuttle in 4.52 seconds and the 3-cone drill in 7.47 seconds. He measured a  vertical jump and an  broad jump.

Miami Dolphins
After going undrafted in the 2007 NFL Draft, Bruce was signed by the Miami Dolphins as an undrafted free agent. He was waived on September 1 during final cuts.

Oakland Raiders
Bruce was signed to the Oakland Raiders practice squad on October 10, 2007.

Arizona Rattlers
Bruce played for the Arizona Rattlers of the Arena Football League in 2008, recording eight tackles (three solo) and a pass breakup.

Jacksonville Jaguars
On June 25, 2008 Bruce signed with the Jacksonville Jaguars because the Jaguars had not yet signed Derrick Harvey. During a pre-season game against the Atlanta Falcons,  Mkristo, had 3 sacks. He was promoted to the active roster on December 4 after cornerback Rashean Mathis was placed on injured reserve. He was later released on June 17, 2009.

Florida Tuskers
Bruce was signed by the Florida Tuskers of the United Football League on August 25, 2009. He was released before the season began.

Oklahoma City Yard Dawgz
Bruce returned to the AFL in 2010 when he signed with the Oklahoma City Yard Dawgz. Bruce recording 8 tackles, 1.5 sacks and forced a fumble.

See also
 List of Arena Football League and National Football League players

References

External links
Jacksonville Jaguars bio
Washington State Cougars bio

1984 births
Living people
Players of American football from Seattle
American football defensive ends
Washington State Cougars football players
Miami Dolphins players
Oakland Raiders players
Arizona Rattlers players
Jacksonville Jaguars players
Florida Tuskers players
Oklahoma City Yard Dawgz players